Yevgeni Vladimirovich Voronin (born 31 October 1995) is a Russian football player who plays for FC Volga Ulyanovsk.

Club career
He made his debut in the Russian Football National League for FC KAMAZ Naberezhnye Chelny on 10 July 2021 in a game against FC Alania Vladikavkaz.

References

External links
 
 
 Profile by Russian Football National League

1995 births
Footballers from Moscow
Living people
Russian footballers
Association football midfielders
FC Lokomotiv Moscow players
FC Vityaz Podolsk players
FC Volga Ulyanovsk players
FC KAMAZ Naberezhnye Chelny players
FC Yenisey Krasnoyarsk players
Russian Second League players
Russian First League players